Jonathan Peter Marland, Baron Marland (born 14 August 1956) is a British businessman and politician, having served as Prime Minister's Trade Envoy, Minister for Energy and Climate Change and Business, Innovation and Skills, and Treasurer of the Conservative Party. Marland is currently the Chairman of the Commonwealth Enterprise and Investment Council.

Education
Marland was educated at Shrewsbury School.

Business career
Marland was one of the founding directors of Jardine Lloyd Thompson Group plc, a multinational insurance business.  He led the acquisitions or investment of Janspeed Ltd, Hunter Wellington Boots, Insurance Capital Partners, Jubilee Holdings Ltd, The Cricketer magazine, and Eco World Management and Advisory Services (UK) Ltd.

He is a member of the Investment Advisory Committee of the Kuwait Investment Authority.

He was one of the owners of SCL Group and Cambridge Analytica, having been convinced by Nigel Oakes to invest in a company that should focus on "security and military advice".

Political career

Government posts
In 2010, Marland was made a Minister at the Department of Energy and Climate Change.

In May 2011 he was appointed as the Chairman of the British Business Ambassadors by UK Trade & Investment (UKTI).

In 2012, Marland was made a Minister for Intellectual property in the Department for Business, Innovation and Skills.

He was the Prime Minister's Trade Envoy between 2011 and 2014.

In 2014 he became Chairman of the Commonwealth Enterprise and Investment Council.

Party and parliamentary roles 
Marland was the Conservative candidate for the target seat of Somerton and Frome at the 2001 general election, coming second to the incumbent Liberal Democrat MP, David Heath.

He was Treasurer to the Conservative Party from 2003 to 2007, and subsequently became a key part of the team which saw the election of Boris Johnson as Mayor of London.

Opposition posts
In 2009, Marland was made an opposition Whip in the House of Lords, as well as an opposition spokesman for the Cabinet Office, and the Department of Energy and Climate Change.

Other interests
Away from business and politics, Marland has interests in the arts and sport.

He is the Chairman of Tickets for Troops, Chairman of The Guggenheim UK Charitable Trust and Atlantic Partnership, the Patron of Salisbury and South Wiltshire Cricket and Hockey Club and a Fellow of the Royal Society of Arts.  He is a member of the Peggy Guggenheim Museum Executive Board and Trustee of Commonwealth Walkway Trust.

He was formerly Chairman of The Churchill Centre UK (until 2019), and Chairman of The Sports Nexus Trust and Harnham Water Meadows Trust.  He was President of Salisbury City F.C. and is a member of the MCC.  In January 2009 he challenged Giles Clarke for the chairmanship of the ECB  but was unsuccessful, despite having pledged to raise a £100m capital fund for development across all 18 counties if elected as chairman.

He is a former Trustee of the Holburne Museum in Bath, and Development Board Member of the Royal Academy of Arts.

Personal life
Marland is married to Penny, a probation officer, and they have four children. Lady Marland was High Sheriff of Wiltshire in 2017.

Honours and awards 
He was awarded a life peerage on 8 June 2006 as Baron Marland, of Odstock in the County of Wiltshire. In 2015, he was awarded the Order of Merit of Malta.

Arms

References

External links 
  – FS Club webinar, May 2022

1957 births
Living people
People from Wiltshire
People educated at Shrewsbury School
British businesspeople
Conservative Party (UK) life peers
Life peers created by Elizabeth II